Andrea Arrigoni Marocco (born 10 August 1988) is an Italian footballer who plays as a midfielder for  club Fidelis Andria.

Career
Arrigoni is a youth product of Atalanta. Arrigoni left Atalanta to Sangiovannese in temporary deal on 11 July 2007. From 2008 to 2011 half of his registration rights was farmed to three Lega Pro clubs until June 2011. In June 2011 Atalanta gave up the rights.

On 19 July 2012 he was signed by Tritium. He moved to Pavia in July 2013.

On 15 July 2014 he was signed by Cosenza. On 27 June 2016 Arrigoni was signed by Lecce, effective on 1 July.

On 13 July 2019, he signed a 3-year contract with Teramo.

On 24 August 2022, Arrigoni joined Fidelis Andria.

Honours
 Lega Pro Prima Divisione (Group B): 2012 (Ternana)

References

External links
 FIGC 
 Football.it Profile 
 

1988 births
Living people
Sportspeople from the Province of Lecco
Italian footballers
Association football midfielders
Serie B players
Serie C players
Lega Pro Seconda Divisione players
Atalanta B.C. players
A.S.D. Sangiovannese 1927 players
A.C. Mezzocorona players
Calcio Lecco 1912 players
Ternana Calcio players
Tritium Calcio 1908 players
F.C. Pavia players
Cosenza Calcio players
U.S. Lecce players
S.S. Teramo Calcio players
S.S. Fidelis Andria 1928 players
Italy youth international footballers
Footballers from Lombardy